Mount Mooney is a ridge-shaped mountain,  high, standing just north of the La Gorce Mountains, where it rises above the middle of Robison Glacier, in the Queen Maud Mountains of Antarctica. It was discovered in December 1934 by the Byrd Antarctic Expedition geological party under Quin Blackburn, and named by Rear Admiral Byrd for James E. Mooney, who assisted this and later Byrd expeditions. From 1959 to 1965, Mooney served as Deputy United States Antarctic Projects Officer.

References

Mountains of Marie Byrd Land